Billy Newton-Davis (born April 26, 1951, in Cleveland, Ohio, United States) is an American-Canadian R&B, jazz and gospel singer and songwriter.

Biography
Newton-Davis grew up in Shaker Heights, Ohio, a suburb of Cleveland. He was one of two lead singers in a local soul band called The Illusions. After working as a singer and dancer on Broadway, he moved to Toronto, Ontario in 1980. His debut album, Love Is a Contact Sport, won the Juno Award for best R&B/soul recording in 1986 and included the hits "Deeper", "Right Beside You" and "Find My Way Back".

His 1989 follow up, Spellbound, included his biggest Canadian chart hit, "I Can't Take It", as well as the Celine Dion duet "Can't Live With You, Can't Live Without You" and again won the Juno for best R&B/soul recording.

Newton-Davis subsequently joined The Nylons in 1991. Since leaving the Nylons, he has primarily concentrated on songwriting and live jazz and gospel performances. He also performed vocals on a number of deadmau5 tracks, including "All U Ever Want", and "R My Dreams" from At Play Vol. 2.

In 2008, Newton-Davis won the Juno Award for All You Ever Want as Best Dance Album. Openly gay, his On A Boy's Life (2008) is a "celebration of all the naughty things men can get up to when left to their own devices." Diagnosed HIV-positive in 1986 at the height of his career, he first went public with his status in a documentary by Sylvia Sweeney that aired on Vision TV in 2000.

Discography

Studio albums
 Love Is a Contact Sport (1986)
 Spellbound (1989)

Singles

As lead artist
 "Romance" (1981)
 "Right Beside You" (1986)
 "Find My Way Back" (1986)
 "Deeper" (1986)
 "Spellbound" (1989)
 "Can't Live with You, Can't Live Without You" (1989) (with Celine Dion)
 "I Can't Take it" (1989)

As featured artist
 The Boomtang Boys – "The Promised Land" (1995)
 deadmau5 – "Outta My Life" (2007)
 Nino Anthony – "Everything I Wanna Do" (2008)
 deadmau5 – "I Like Your Music" (2008)
 Nino Anthony – "Our House World" (2009)
 deadmau5 – "All You Ever Want" (2009)
 Spekrfreks vs Melleefresh – "Candy" (2010)

References

External links
Billy Newton-Davis on Myspace

American expatriate musicians in Canada
American emigrants to Canada
20th-century Black Canadian male singers
Canadian gospel singers
Canadian jazz singers
21st-century Black Canadian male singers
Canadian contemporary R&B singers
Juno Award for Breakthrough Artist of the Year winners
Canadian LGBT singers
Canadian LGBT songwriters
LGBT people from Ohio
Musicians from Cleveland
1951 births
Living people
Musicians from Shaker Heights, Ohio
Canadian gay musicians
People with HIV/AIDS
Gay singers
Gay songwriters
Juno Award for R&B/Soul Recording of the Year winners
The Nylons members
Canadian male jazz musicians
20th-century Canadian LGBT people
21st-century Canadian LGBT people
Canadian male singer-songwriters